Guangling may refer to:

 A historical name of Yangzhou, Jiangsu, China
 Guangling District (广陵区), the historical center of Yangzhou
 Guangling Commandery (廣陵郡), historical commandery of China centered in present-day Yangzhou
 Guangling County (广灵县), in Shanxi, China

See also
 Guanling Buyei and Miao Autonomous County (关岭布依族苗族自治县), in Guizhou, China